David Landale (6 August 1868 – 6 September 1935) was the 13th Tai-pan of the Jardine Matheson & Co. and member of the Executive Council and Legislative Council of Hong Kong.

Early life

Born on 6 August 1868, Landale was the son of Rev. David Landale and Margaret Helen Hassels Jardine, daughter of Sir William Jardine, 7th Baronet, a distant relative of the founder of the prominent trading house Jardine Matheson & Co., William Jardine. He was educated at Fettes College, Edinburgh.

Career in China

Landale moved to the Far East and became both managing director of Jardine Matheson and the Chairman of the Shanghai Municipal Council in 1907. He was also director of the Hongkong and Shanghai Banking Corporation until his resignation in 1920.

He was appointed as unofficial member of the Legislative Council of Hong Kong in 1913 and Executive Council in 1916. He was also the chairman of the Hong Kong General Chamber of Commerce in 1915.

Marriage

In 1902 he married Mildred Sophia, second daughter of John Fortune. They had two sons and two daughters.  One of his sons David Fortune "Taffy" Landale also became the Chairman and Managing Director of Jardines. He was maternal great-grandfather to Olympic champion, Matthew Pinsent.

Death

Landale died on 6 September 1935 in London, England.

Landale St

Landale Street in Wan Chai on Hong Kong Island was named after David Landale.

References

1868 births
1935 deaths
People educated at Fettes College
Hong Kong businesspeople
Chairmen of HSBC
Jardine Matheson Group
Hong Kong people of Scottish descent
Scottish expatriates in Hong Kong
Scottish expatriates in China
Members of the Executive Council of Hong Kong
Members of the Legislative Council of Hong Kong
Chairmen of the Shanghai Municipal Council